Raquel de Souza Noronha (born 10 May 1978), commonly known as Raquel, is a Brazilian football midfielder.

After making her national team debut against Russia at the 1998 Women's U.S. Cup, she played for the Brazil women's national football team at the 1999 FIFA Women's World Cup and 2000 Summer Olympics.

In 2005 she played for Women's Premier Soccer League (WPSL) club Bay State Select, alongside compatriot Daniela Alves Lima. She scored five goals and served three assists in 13 appearances.

See also
 Brazil at the 2000 Summer Olympics

References

External links
 
 Profile at sports-reference.com
 
 http://www.soccerpunter.com/players/291511-Raquel-de-Souza-Noronha
 http://www.soccertimes.com/worldcup/1999/capsules/brazil.htm

1978 births
Living people
Brazilian women's footballers
Place of birth missing (living people)
Footballers at the 2000 Summer Olympics
Olympic footballers of Brazil
Women's association football midfielders
1999 FIFA Women's World Cup players
Brazil women's international footballers
Bay State Select players
Women's Premier Soccer League players
Expatriate women's soccer players in the United States
Brazilian expatriate sportspeople in the United States
São Paulo FC (women) players
Footballers from Porto Alegre